The Fighters is the third studio album by American country pop duo LoCash (formerly LoCash Cowboys). It was released on June 17, 2016 via Reviver Records. It includes the singles I Love This Life and I Know Somebody.

Commercial performance
The album debuted at No. 131 on Billboard 200, No. 14 on Top Country Albums, selling 4,200 copies in the first week.  The album has sold 20,600 copies in the United States as of October 2016.

Track listing

Personnel
Musicians

 Bruce Bouton – pedal steel guitar
 Steve Brewster – drums
 Preston Brust – vocals
 Howard Duck – Hammond B-3 organ
 Tommy Harden – drums
 Evan Hutchings – drums
 Mike Johnson – pedal steel guitar
 Chris Lucas – vocals
 Pat McGrath – banjo, bouzouki, acoustic guitar, mando 
 Rob McNelley – electric guitar
 Steve Mackey – bass guitar
 Josh Matheny – dobro
 James Mitchell – electric guitar 
 Russ Pahl – pedal steel guitar
 Alison Prestwood – bass guitar
 Lindsay Rimes – banjo, bass guitar, acoustic guitar, electric guitar, keyboards, synthesizer strings, synthesizer, background vocals
 Jeff Roach – Hammond B-3 organ, piano
 Jerry Roe – drums
 Ilya Toshinsky – banjo, mando
 Michael Tyler – background vocals 

Production
 Danielle Blakey – vocal engineer
 Jerome Bunke – production supervision
 Adam Engelhardt – engineer
 Dan Frizsell – engineer
 Taylor Pollert – assistant engineer
 Sam Raymond – assistant engineer
 Lindsay Rimes – mixing, producer, programming 
 David Ross – executive producer
 Leon Zervos – mastering

Charts

Album

References 

2016 albums
LoCash albums
Albums produced by Lindsay Rimes